The 1984 French Grand Prix was a Formula One motor race held at Dijon on 20 May 1984. It was race 5 of 16 in the 1984 FIA Formula One World Championship.

This was the final Formula One race to be held at the  Dijon-Prenois circuit, as it was deemed too short by governing body FISA. Fittingly in France, Frenchman Patrick Tambay, in the all-French team (French car, French engine, French tyres and French fuel) scored the Equipe Renault team's last pole position until their return to the sport in 2002.

Double World Champion Niki Lauda won the race in his McLaren-TAG, his first win in France since 1975. Tambay finished second in his Renault RE50, with the Lotus-Renault of Nigel Mansell third. Lauda's team-mate and World Championship leader, Alain Prost, could only manage seventh after he was forced to pit to change a loose wheel.

Andrea de Cesaris failed to qualify his Ligier, but nonetheless started the race and finished tenth. De Cesaris' Friday qualifying time was disallowed when his car's onboard fire extinguisher was found to be empty, before rain in the Saturday session prevented him from setting a time fast enough to make the grid. Ligier took the bizarre step of withdrawing their second car, driven by François Hesnault (who had qualified 14th), in order to allow de Cesaris to start 26th and last.

Classification

Qualifying

Race

Championship standings after the race

Drivers' Championship standings

Constructors' Championship standings

References

French Grand Prix
French Grand Prix
Grand Prix